The  is a railway line operated by Japanese private railway company Tokyu Corporation. Additionally, the Meguro line interoperates with the Tokyo Metro Namboku Line and Toei Mita Line beyond Meguro.

History
1923:
March 11: The line opens as the Meguro Line between Meguro and Maruko (now Numabe) (on the current Tamagawa Line).
October: Meguro-Fudōmae station is renamed to Fudōmae station.
November 1: The line is extended from Maruko to Kamata, and the line is renamed to the Mekama line.
1924, June 1: Koyama becomes Musashi-Koyama.
1926, January 1: Chōfu and Tamagawa stations are renamed to Den-en-Chōfu and Maruko-Tamagawa stations respectively.
1928, August 1: Nishi-Koyama station opens.
1931, January 1: Maruko-Tamagawa station is renamed again to Tamagawa-en-mae station.
1977, December 16: Tamagawa-en-mae station is renamed yet again to Tamagawa-en station.
1994, November 27: Den-en-Chōfu station moves underground.
1997:
June 27: Ōokayama station moves underground.
July 27: Meguro station moves underground.
1999, October 10: Fudōmae station is elevated.
2000:
August 6: Service is split into two services, Meguro - Musashi-Kosugi and Tamagawa - Kamata. Tamagawa-en station is renamed to Tamagawa station and one-man operation begins.
September 26: Through service begins with the Tokyo Metro Namboku and Toei Mita Lines.
2001, March 28: Through service begins with the Saitama Rapid Railway line via the Namboku line.
2006:
July 2: As part of a grade separation project between Fudōmae and Senzoku, Musashi-Koyama and Nishi-Koyama stations move underground.
September 25: Express service commences.
2008, June 22: Service extended to Hiyoshi.
2022, April: Eight-car trains commence operation on the line.

Future plans 
Platforms on Meguro Line are going to be lengthened in order to accommodate 8-car trainsets and allow through services with Sōtetsu Shin-Yokohama Line. The operation of 8-car trainsets commenced in April 2022. The through service onto the Sōtetsu Shin-Yokohama Line will begin on 18 March 2023. The majority of local trains still terminate at Hiyoshi.

Stations

Ridership

Rolling stock

Tokyu
 3000 series 8-car EMUs
 3020 series 8-car EMUs
 5080 series 8-car EMUs

Other operators
 Saitama Rapid Railway 2000 series 6-car EMUs (Saitama Rapid Railway Line)
 Toei 6300 series 6-car EMUs (Toei Mita Line)
 Toei 6500 series 8-car EMUs (Toei Mita Line)
 Tokyo Metro 9000 series 6-car EMUs (Tokyo Metro Namboku Line)

Sotetsu 21000 series 8-car EMUs (Sōtetsu Main Line or Sōtetsu Izumino Line, via the Sōtetsu Shin-Yokohama Line)

Former connecting lines
 Okusawa station - A 1 km 1067mm gauge line, electrified at 600 VDC, from Shin-Okusawa operated between 1928 and 1935, providing a connection to Yukigaya-Otsuka on the Tokyu Ikegami Line.

See also
 List of railway lines in Japan

References

External links

 Tokyu Corporation website 

Meguro Line
Railway lines in Tokyo
1067 mm gauge railways in Japan
Railway lines opened in 1923
1923 establishments in Japan